The 1979–80 season was Ascoli Calcio 1898''s second consecutive season in Serie A, 'the top league of Italian football. This article covers the events from 16 September 1979 to 11 May 1980. They finished in 5th, their best ever finish in Serie A in their history.

Squad

Goalkeepers 
 Luigi Muraro
 Happy Pulici

Defenders 
 Donato Anzivino
 Simone Boldini
 Angiolino Gasparini
 Eugenio Perico
 Francesco Last

Midfielders 
 Gian Franco Bellotto
 Giuliano Castoldi
 Adelio Moro
 Silvio Paolucci
 Alessandro Scanziani
 Fortunato Torrisi
 Carlo Trevisanello

Attackers 
 Pietro Anastasi
 Maurizio Iorio
 Hubert Pircher

Serie A

References

Sources 
- RSSSF - Italy Championship 1979/80

Ascoli
Ascoli Picchio F.C. 1898 seasons